The general speed limits in Luxembourg are as follows:

References

Luxembourg
Roads in Luxembourg